Boeun, (報恩, Offering Gratitude and Repaying), is one of the main teachings of Jeungism. Bo (報) means "repay" and eun (恩) means "gratitude". Its literal meaning is repay other's gratitude to me.

Aspects
One aspect of offering gratitude and repaying is to offer respect to parents, ancestors, and teachers to whom we are all indebted. Another is to avoid unnecessary indebtedness and dependence so that we can act freely. It also involves giving credit where credit is due.

Quote from Dojeon
It is difficult to serve heaven and earth if you do not respect your parents. Heaven and earth are the parents of humanity, and parents are the heaven and earth of their children. If descendants treat their ancestors badly, ancestors treat the descendants in the same way.
Dojeon 2:41:3-5

If you are given a bowl of rice, do not forget it. If you are given only half a bowl of rice, do not forget it. There is a saying, ‘Never fail to repay the benevolence of being given a meal.’ But I say, ‘never fail to repay the benevolence of even half a meal.
Dojeon 2:40:3-4

In the Early Heaven, being dependent on others has led people to ruin. You should not even lean on the walls of your own room. Do not wish for the benevolence of others. If you receive many favors, you will be indebted and kept from acting freely. The beast called failure is one-legged. Two of them must lean on each other to walk. When you depend on someone, you are bound to fail.
Dojeon 8:16:5-7

Enlightenment is the ultimate way of repaying heaven and earth.
Dojeon 6:82:5

You have to discover your own mind and do your own work.
Dojeon 11:96:8

See also
 Sangjenim 上帝
 Taemonim 太母
 Gaebyeok (or Gae-byuk) 開闢
 Tae Eul Ju mantra 太乙呪
 Wonsibanbon (Returning to the Origin) 原始反本
 Haewon (Resolution of Bitterness and Grief) 解怨
 Sangsaeng (Mutual life-giving) 相生
 Boeun (Offering Gratitude and Repayment) 報恩
 Dojeon - Sacred text of Jeung San Do 道典
 Dojang - Dao center 道場
 Cosmic Year - Shao Yung (AD 1011-1077) 宇宙一年
 Euitong - To heal and to unite
 Cheonjigongsa - Renewal of Heaven and Earth 天地公事
 Nam Sa Go prophecy

References

Jeung San Do